Tim Weaver (born 1977) is an English writer primarily known for his crime thrillers featuring missing persons investigator David Raker.

Career

Journalism 
Prior to publication of his first book, Weaver was a videogames journalist. He was editor of N64 Magazine and spent six years as editor of Xbox World, leaving the magazine in 2011. He also appeared as co-host of YouTube show GTA V O'Clock. In his wider career as a journalist, he has written about the long struggle he and his wife had to start a family.

Novels 
Weaver's debut crime thriller Chasing the Dead was finally released in February of 2010, after ten years of trying to find a publisher. The story introduced the character of David Raker. Raker is a former journalist, who gave up his career in newspapers to care for his wife after she was diagnosed with terminal cancer. The book begins twelve months after her death, centering on the mysterious reappearance of a man thought to have died in a car crash. On a BBC Radio Somerset interview, when asked about Raker's background, Weaver described how he drew on his own traumatic battle to have a child.

His fourth book, Never Coming Back, is the first in the series to move entirely away from London, and is set in Devon and Las Vegas. On 28 August 2013 it was announced that Never Coming Back had been selected for the Richard and Judy Autumn 2013 Book Club. On 18 November 2013, it was shortlisted for Crime & Thriller of the Year in the Specsavers National Book Awards, and on 16 December 2013 iTunes included it in their 'Best of 2013' list, naming it Best British Crime Thriller.

On his decision to have David Raker specialise in missing persons cases, Weaver has said: "I just became very interested in the idea of a person going missing in an age where we have CCTV on every street, 24-hour rolling news channels, and constant access to cameras through our phones. It seemed like an intriguing starting point for a book. It sounds trite, but I was also struck by the human cost. Can you imagine how many stories must go untold when a person vanishes?"

In October 2013, Weaver contributed a short story entitled Disconnection to #YouDunnit, a joint venture between Penguin and Specsavers. The major themes of the story – including the victim, crime scene location, and central character – were crowdsourced on Twitter.

Weaver's tenth book, No One Home, was again selected for the Richard and Judy Book Club on 20 February 2020 and on 15 April 2021, Weaver released his first standalone novel, Missing Pieces.

Missing podcast 
In September 2015, Weaver wrote and presented an eight-part podcast series called Missing, looking into how and why people disappear. It was selected by iTunes as one of the best podcasts of 2015. In August 2016, Weaver recorded three further episodes.

Personal life 
Weaver attended Norton Hill School in Midsomer Norton, Somerset. He also describes himself as a "massive, massive football fan", and supports Arsenal and Bath City F.C.

Bibliography

David Raker novels 
 2010 – Chasing the Dead
 2011 – The Dead Tracks
 2012 – Vanished
 2013 – Never Coming Back
 2014 – Fall From Grace
 2015 – What Remains
 2016 – Broken Heart
 2017 – I Am Missing
 2018 – You Were Gone
 2019 – No One Home
 2021 – The Shadow at the Door
 2022 – The Blackbird
 2023 – The Last Goodbye

Standalone novels 
 2021 – Missing Pieces

Short stories 
 2013 – Disconnection

References

External links
 

21st-century English writers
English thriller writers
1977 births
Living people